The C. A. O'Donohue House is a historic house located at 158 Shore Road in Huntington Bay, Suffolk County, New York.

Description and history 
It was built in 1917, and is a massive, -story, three-bay wide, shingled gable-roofed dwelling with smaller flanking three-bay wings. It features a two-story portico with colossal Doric order columns and topped by a decorative balustrade. It is representative of the Colonial Revival style.

It was added to the National Register of Historic Places on September 26, 1985.

References

Houses on the National Register of Historic Places in New York (state)
Colonial Revival architecture in New York (state)
Houses completed in 1917
Houses in Suffolk County, New York
National Register of Historic Places in Suffolk County, New York